Ronald Eugene Withem (June 9, 1946 – May 28, 2020) was an American politician who served in the Nebraska Legislature from the 14th district from 1983 to 1997. He served as Speaker of the Nebraska Legislature from 1993 to 1997. Withem resigned from the legislature to serve as a lobbyist for the University of Nebraska–Lincoln, replacing former legislative colleague Lee Rupp.

He died of Parkinson's disease on May 28, 2020, in Papillion, Nebraska at age 73.

References

1946 births
2020 deaths
People from Harrison County, Iowa
Democratic Party Nebraska state senators
20th-century American politicians
University of Nebraska–Lincoln people
Speakers of the Nebraska Legislature
Neurological disease deaths in Nebraska
Deaths from Parkinson's disease
American lobbyists